Chelis maculosa Speckled Pellicle is a tiger moth of the family Erebidae. It is found in Southern and Central Europe up to Hungary, in eastern direction it occurs through Ukraine, Southern Russia, Kazakhstan to north-western regions of Chinese Xinjiang.

The wingspan is 32–34 mm. The moth flies from June to August depending on the location.

The larvae feed on Galium verum and at times also other Galium species.

Subspecies
Chelis maculosa maculosa
Chelis maculosa arragonensis (Staudinger, 1894)
Chelis maculosa honesta (Tauscher, 1806)
Chelis maculosa stertzi (Schulz, 1902)

References

External links

Moths and Butterflies of Europe and North Africa
Fauna Europaea
Lepiforum.de
www.schmetterling-raupe.de

Arctiina
Moths of Europe
Moths of Asia
Moths described in 1780